Saintonge may refer to:
County of Saintonge, a historical province of France on the Atlantic coast
Saintonge (region), a region of France corresponding to the historical province
 Saintonge ware, a medieval pottery type produced in Saintes region of France from the 13th century

Places
Saint-Genis-de-Saintonge, a commune in the Charente-Maritime department in southwestern France
, a street in Marais, Paris' 3rd arrondissement

People
Jean-Pierre Saintonge (born 1945), Quebec, Canada educator, lawyer, judge and political figure
Anne de Xainctonge or de Saintonge (1567–1621), founder of the Society of the Sisters of Saint Ursula of the Blessed Virgin, the first non-cloistered women's religious community

Others
Saintongese, people from Saintonge, an area in western France
Saintonge Regiment, infantry regiments of France
Saintonge War, a feudal dynastic encounter that occurred in 1242 and 1243 between forces of Louis IX of France, Alphonse of Poiters and those of Henry III of England, Hugh X of Lusignan, and Raymond VII of Toulouse

See also
Saintongeais dialect
Saintongese (disambiguation)
St. Onge (disambiguation)
Onge (disambiguation)